
Jingxi may refer to:

Jingxi, Guangxi, a county-level city administered by Baise, Guangxi
Jingxi (prince) (1668–1717), Prince Xi of the Second Rank of the Qing dynasty
Jingxi Circuit, a circuit (province) during the Song dynasty
Peking opera, a Chinese opera genre, alternately known as Jingxi

Towns in China
Jingxi, Minhou County, Fujian
Jingxi, Wanyuan, Sichuan

Subdistricts in China
Jingxi Subdistrict, Sanming, in Sanyuan District, Sanming, Fujian
Jingxi Subdistrict, Guangzhou, in Baiyun District, Guangzhou, Guangdong
Jingxi Subdistrict, Nanchong, in Shunqing District, Nanchong, Sichuan

See also
Jingxi Hotel, a hotel in Beijing
Jinxi (disambiguation)